

Events
 End of the reign of king Pygmalion of Tyre
 Shalmaneser IV begins his campaign to Namri in Urartu and a final campaign to Damascus

Births

Deaths

References

770s BC